Massive Killing Capacity is the third album by Dismember. It was re-released by Regain Records in 2005. A music video was made for the track "Casket Garden".

Track listing

Personnel
 Matti Kärki - vocals
 Fred Estby - drums
 David Blomqvist - lead guitar
 Richard Cabeza - bass
 Robert Sennebäck - guitar

References

Dismember (band) albums
Albums with cover art by Kristian Wåhlin
1995 albums
Nuclear Blast albums